Mississippi Highway 184 (MS 184) is an east–west state highway in the U.S. state of Mississippi. It is a non-continuous highway, composed of segments from the previous path of U.S. Highway 84 (US 84) that have been displaced by new construction.

Most of the segments of MS 184 serve as business routes, providing access from US 84 to towns where they are located.

MS 184 consists of nine sections that all connect with US 84 in the towns of Waynesboro, near Laurel, Collins, Prentiss, Silver Creek, Monticello, Brookhaven, Bude, and Meadville.

Meadville-Bude

MS 184 begins just southwest of Meadville at an intersection US 84. It heads northeast as a two-lane highway along Main Street to enter the city limits and almost immediately pass through downtown, where it has an intersection with MS 556. It then turns southeast through rural areas to enter Bude and have an interchange with US 84, where it becomes concurrent with US 98 and widens to a four-lane divided highway for a short distance. US 98 breaks off shortly thereafter and MS 184 continues northeast through neighborhoods and passes through downtown shortly before coming to an end at another intersection with US 84.

Major junctions

Brookhaven

It heads northeast as a 2-lane highway along Natchez Avenue to enter the city limits and pass through neighborhoods before having an intersection with US 51. This segment of MS 184 ends here.

MS 184 resumes at the intersection of West Monticello Street, Turnbough Avenue, and Schwem Avenue, the latter of which carries the easternmost portion of MS 550. MS 184 heads east along West Monticello Street through downtown Brookhaven, first intersecting the eastern terminus of MS 588 at Brookhaven Boulevard. It later has an intersection with MS 583 (South 1st Street). MS 184 now passes through some neighborhoods before leaving Brookhaven and continuing southeast through rural areas for a few miles before coming to an end at an intersection with US 84.

Major junctions

Monticello

MS 184 begins just west of town at an intersection with US 84. It heads east through rural areas to enter the city limits and almost immediately have an intersection with MS 27. The highway becomes W Broad Street and passes through neighborhoods before passing through downtown, where it has an intersection with MS 587. MS 184 continues east to leave downtown and cross a bridge over the Pearl River, where it leaves Monticello and continues east through rural areas to come to an intersection with MS 43. The highway comes to an end at another intersection with US 84. The entire route of MS 184 is a two-lane highway.

Major junctions

Silver Creek

MS 184 begins just southwest of town at an intersection with US 84. It heads northeast through rural areas to enter the city limits and have a Y-intersection with N.A. Sandifer Highway just before entering downtown along Southern Avenue. The highway heads east through downtown to have an intersection with MS 43 and MS 43A (Front Street) before leaving Silver Creek and turning southeast to cross a bridge over the Silver Creek. MS 184 continues southeast through rural areas before coming to an end at an intersection with US 84. The entire route of MS 184 is a two-lane highway.

Major junctions

Prentiss

MS 184 begins just west of town at an intersection with US 84. It heads east as a two-lane highway through rural areas to pass just south of Prentiss-Jefferson Davis County Airport to enter the Prentiss city limits, widens to a 4-lane divided highway, immediately enters a business district, and comes to an intersection with MS 13 (Columbia Avenue). MS 184 becomes concurrent with MS 13 and they have an intersection with MS 42 as they bypass downtown to the south and east, while also narrowing to 2-lanes and passing through rural areas. The highway then has another intersection with Columbia Avenue just north town, where MS 184 becomes unsigned and splits from MS 13 and heads northeast through rural areas for approximately  before coming to a dead end just a few feet from the eastbound lanes of US 84.

Major junctions

Collins

MS 184 begins just west of town at an intersection with US 84. It heads east along Main Street to enter the city limits as a 4-lane divided highway, passing through mostly rural areas to have an interchange with US 49. The highway narrows to 2-lanes and passes through neighborhoods before passing through downtown. MS 184 now widens back to 4-lanes as it crosses a bridge over the Bouie River shortly before coming to an end at an intersection with US 84 just east of town.

History
The city of Collins has accepted a bid to install new lights down the stretch of highway that runs through their city. The city planning department expects to complete the work by the end of 2019.

Major junctions

Laurel

Both of its termini are at US 84, with no other major intersections or communities along the highway. The eastern terminus of this segment is at a superstreet intersection with US 84. The entire route of MS 184 is a two-lane highway.

Major junctions

Waynesboro

MS 184 begins west of town at an intersection with US 84. It heads east to cross the Chickasawhay River and enter the Waynesboro city limits. The highway passes through some industrial areas as Azalea Drive before passing through some neighborhoods and entering downtown. MS 184 passes through downtown and has intersections with MS 63 (Turner Street) and MS 145 (Mississippi Drive) before turning northeast through a mix of neighborhoods business districts to come to an intersection with US 45. It heads east along Central Road for a short distance before turning northeast along Highway 184 E through rural areas before coming to a dead end at the northeastern edge of the city limits, which is feet from the eastbound lanes of US 84. The entire route of MS 184 is a two-lane highway.

Major junctions

See also

References

External links

184
U.S. Route 84
Transportation in Franklin County, Mississippi
Transportation in Lincoln County, Mississippi
Transportation in Lawrence County, Mississippi
Transportation in Jefferson Davis County, Mississippi
Transportation in Covington County, Mississippi
Transportation in Jones County, Mississippi
Transportation in Wayne County, Mississippi